Dancing Beethoven is a 2017 documentary film by the Spanish director Arantxa Aguirre. It is about the work of the choreographer Maurice Béjart, founder of the Ballet of the 20th Century and other dance companies. Shooting took place in Lausanne and Tokyo over nine months.

It tells the story of a revival of choreography created by Béjart in the 1960s for Beethoven's Ninth Symphony. The performance is given in Tokyo and the dancers are from the Béjart Ballet Lausanne and Tokyo Ballet, accompanied by the Israel Philharmonic Orchestra, conducted by Zubin Mehta.

Cast

Awards and nominations 
Dancing Beethoven was nominated in the 32nd Goya Awards for Best Documentary Film and for the for Best Documentary Feature although finally  won.

References

External links 
 

Documentary films about ballet
Spanish documentary films
Swiss documentary films